Dourbali is a city in Chad, located in the region of Chari-Baguirmi.

Chari-Baguirmi Region
Populated places in Chad